Protohertzina is a genus of conodonts (protoconodonts or paraconodonts) or, possibly, Chaetognaths, found at the beginning of the Cambrian explosion.

Protoconodonts are an extinct taxonomic group of conodonts. Chaetognaths (also known as arrow worms) were thought possibly to be related to some of the animals grouped with the conodonts. The conodonts themselves, however, are thought to be related to the vertebrates. It is now thought that protoconodont elements (e.g., Protohertzina anabarica Missarzhevsky, 1973), are probably grasping spines of chaetognaths rather than teeth of conodonts.

Protohertzina fossils have been found in the Ingta Formation of Canada.

Use in stratigraphy 
The earliest known fossils of the late Precambrian and early Cambrian come from the small shelly fossil assemblage of the Anabarites trisulcatus Zone of the Lower Nemakit-Daldynian Stage, Siberia. They are analogous to China's Anabarites trisulcatus-Protohertzina anabarica Zone of the basal Meishucunian Stage.

References

External links 

 
 
 

Cambrian animals of North America
Conodont genera
Cambrian conodonts
Fossil taxa described in 1973
Paleozoic life of Nova Scotia

Cambrian genus extinctions